Hrabkov is a village and municipality in Prešov District in the Prešov Region of eastern Slovakia.

History
In historical records the village was first mentioned in 1330.

Geography
The municipality lies at an altitude of 479 metres and covers an area of 16.705 km². It has a population of about 700 people.

Genealogical resources

The records for genealogical research are available at the state archive "Statny Archiv in Presov, Slovakia"

 Roman Catholic church records (births/marriages/deaths): 1792-1895 (parish B)
 Greek Catholic church records (births/marriages/deaths): 1825-1898 (parish B)

See also
 List of municipalities and towns in Slovakia

References

External links
 
 
Surnames of living people in Hrabkov

Villages and municipalities in Prešov District
Šariš